Chick tracts are short evangelical  gospel tracts in a comic book format, originally created by American publisher and religious cartoonist Jack Chick in the 1960s. His company Chick Publications has continued to print these tracts, in addition to those by new writers.

Although many of Chick's tracts express views that are generally accepted within mainstream Christian theology, several tracts have expressed controversial viewpoints. Most notably, Chick tracts express strong anti-Catholic views, as well as criticisms of other faiths, including Judaism, Islam, and Mormonism.

Chick Publications 
Chick Publications produces and markets the Chick tracts, along with other comic books, books, and posters. Chick Publications has its headquarters in Rancho Cucamonga, California, and a mailing address in Ontario, California.

As of January 2015, Chick Publications had produced over 250 different titles, about 100 of which are still in print, and are available in over 100 languages.

Format 
The material is written in comic book format, with the front panel featuring the title of the tract and the inside back panel devoted to a standard sinner's prayer. The back cover of the tract contains a blank space for churches to stamp their name and address; Chick Publications is willing to print custom back covers, but at least 10,000 tracts must be ordered.

Themes 
Chick tracts end with a suggested prayer for the reader to pray to accept Jesus Christ. In most of these tracts it is a standard sinner's prayer for salvation. In the tracts dealing with "false religions", the prayer includes a clause to reject these religions. Included with the prayer are directions for converting to Christianity, which is also repeated on the inside back panel along with steps to take should the reader convert to Christianity.

Strips, Toons, and Bluesies, written by Douglas Bevan Dowd and Todd Hignite, stated that "it's safe to assume Chick saw at least some" Tijuana bibles since the books and, according to Dowd and Hignite, Chick tracts were "strikingly similar" to Tijuana bibles; like Tijuana bibles the tracts mostly targeted youth of lower socioeconomic classes and "were loaded with stereotypes". The book stated that Chick tracts contained "way-out, wild" portrayals of recreational drug usage and portrayed "the sexual revolution". In addition the comics included supernatural elements, occult rituals, torture, and cannibalism.

Controversies 
The Southern Poverty Law Center has designated Chick Publications as an active hate group.
The group was listed due to its strong anti-Catholic, anti-Muslim, and anti-homosexual rhetoric.

Chick's critics (such as talk.origins, Hindu American Foundation, and Catholic Answers) have accused him of misrepresentation.

The Hindu American Foundation put out an electronic PDF paper called "Hyperlink to Hinduphobia: Online Hatred, Extremism and Bigotry Against Hindus" which contains a section on Chick's site; the paper ends with the statement "Chick Publications promotes hatred not just against Hindus, but also towards Muslims, Catholics, and others as is evidenced by the following titles of their tracts: 'Last Rites – When this Catholic dies, he learns that his church couldn't save him'; 'The Little Bride – Protect children against being recruited as Muslims. Li'l Susy explains that only Jesus can save them'; and 'Allah Had No Son – The Allah of Islam is not the God of creation.

The tracts' claims about conspiracies are based in large part on the testimony of people who claim to have been members of these groups before converting to Evangelical Christianity, most prominently Alberto Rivera and William Schnoebelen. Many of Chick's critics consider these sources to be frauds or fantasists. One such case was "The Prophet", a comic containing a fantastic tale related by Rivera of how the papacy helped start Islam that turned out to have no basis in reality.

Churches have been criticized for distributing Chick tracts. In October 2011, the Northview Baptist Church in Hillsboro, Ohio, gave out copies of the Chick tract Mean Momma along with candy at Halloween. The church received complaints from parishioners, and its pastor apologized for issuing the tracts, saying that, "Our church does not endorse this type of extreme methodology that was represented in this particular tract, and we can assure you that we will not let this happen again ... our church is a loving church that loves souls and wants to do all we can in our community to help as well as spread and share the Gospel message of Christ."

Chick tracts have also been subject to censorship and have been investigated for hate speech. For instance, Avon and Somerset Police investigated the distribution of Chick publications in Bristol in July 2020.

Anti-Catholicism 
Catholicism is a frequent target of Chick tracts and other writings. No fewer than 20 of the tracts are devoted to Catholicism, including Are Roman Catholics Christians? (arguing that they are not), The Death Cookie (a polemic against the Catholic Eucharist), and Why Is Mary Crying? (arguing that Mary does not support the veneration Catholicism gives her). One notable tract, Mary's Kids, focuses on an elderly Catholic member who disapproved of her son marrying a Pentecostal woman and then teaching their young daughter about the Virgin Mary. The mother convinces the elder that Mary was not a perpetual virgin after confronting her about the fact that her Catholic priests were sex offenders.

Elsewhere, Chick defended the controversial Alberto Rivera in at least one book and in an entire series of six full-length comics. Chick also asserted that the Catholic Church, in a grand conspiracy, created Islam, Communism, Nazism, and Freemasonry. In The New Anti-Catholicism, religious historian Philip Jenkins describes Chick tracts as promulgating "bizarre allegations of Catholic conspiracy and sexual hypocrisy" to perpetuate "anti-papal and anti-Catholic mythologies". Michael Ian Borer, a sociology professor of Furman University at the time, described Chick's strong anti-Catholic themes in a 2007 American Sociological Association presentation and in a peer-reviewed article the next year in Religion and American Culture.

Catholic Answers published a response to the claims of Chick Publications against Roman Catholics and a criticism of Chick tracts in general called The Nightmare World of Jack T. Chick, detailing the inaccuracies, factual errors, and how a "typical tactic in Chick tracts is to portray Catholics as being unpleasant or revolting in various ways".

Anti-Islam 
Islam is also regularly targeted by Chick tracts, and more than ten tracts have been published on the subject. The most notable of these is Allah Had No Son, first published in 1994. In this tract, a Muslim is converted to Christianity when he is told that Allah has origins as a pagan moon god. Camels in the Tent claims that Muslim immigration will lead to the establishment of Sharia law in the United States and the forceful conversion of non-Muslims to Islam.

Chick tracts' depiction of Islam has been frequently criticized. In December 2008, a Singaporean couple was charged with sedition for distributing the Chick tracts The Little Bride and Who Is Allah?. The tracts were said to "promote feelings of ill-will and hostility between Christians and Muslims in Singapore". The Chick Publications website has consequently been blocked in Singapore.

In 2014, the Chick tract Unforgiven was distributed by Bible Baptist Church in Garden City, Roanoke, Virginia, and drew outrage from the area's Muslim community. The tract tells the story of an African-American man who, while in prison, is coerced into joining the Islamic faith and changes his name to Muhammad. Upon his release he threatens his Christian grandmother. Hussain Al-Shiblawi, a local man interviewed by WDBJ-TV, explained that while the pamphlets he received from the church every Sunday were usually inspirational, this tract upset him: "It basically indicated that the people are violent, the religion itself is violent, and the facts in here are not true." Bible Baptist Church said that they did not write the tract and simply distributed it.

Anti-homosexuality 
Chick tracts are unequivocal and explicit in their opposition to homosexuality, and repeatedly employ two anti-homosexual themes:
 the belief that God hates homosexuality and considers it to be sinful, and
 the true nature of homosexuality is revealed in the Christian interpretation of the biblical Sodom and Gomorrah story.

Chick's first tract on the subject, The Gay Blade was originally published in 1972. This tract warned of a gay agenda to push for same-sex marriage and urged homosexuals to repent so they could make it into heaven. The Gay Blade was revised in 1984 and is now out-of-print except by special order. According to Cynthia Burack, this tract borrowed several of its frames from a 1971 Life magazine photo-essay on the Gay Liberation movement, but with the images altered to make the gay men look more dissolute or stereotypically feminized.

Later tracts on homosexuality depict gay rights activists as aggressive and prone to violence. In Doom Town, Chick claims that HIV-positive gay men plan to donate blood to protest lack of federal funding of AIDS research. In Sin City, gay rights activists attack a pastor protesting a gay pride parade, beating him so badly he is subsequently hospitalized. Other tracts, such as Home Alone have pushed the beliefs that gay men convert otherwise heterosexual men into homosexuality and that gay and lesbian individuals are more promiscuous than heterosexual ones.

Chick's claims about homosexuality have angered gay activists. In 1974 the Iowa State University Christian Fellowship passed out copies of over twenty different Chick tracts, including copies of The Gay Blade. Members of the Gay People's Liberation Alliance and the Women's Coalition protested the tracts' distribution, claiming that they provided an inaccurate representation of gay and bisexual people.

Anti-evolution 

Chick published several anti-evolution tracts, but Big Daddy? (which also attempts to refute the existence of the strong nuclear force) remains "the most widely distributed anti-evolution booklet in history".

Critics point out that the Big Daddy? tract mainly uses Kent Hovind as a reference, despite the fact that Hovind has no degrees from accredited institutions in the relevant fields, that the thesis referred to is considered to be of very poor quality, and that his claims are at odds with the published statements of experts in the field.

Big Daddy? is presented in the 2007 book Evolution: What the Fossils Say and Why it Matters as a "typical of the genre" example of just how "misleading and dishonest" creationist presentations are. The examples of the "deceptive and misleading" distortions, misrepresentation, and fabrications presented in that work regarding Big Daddy? are "Nebraska Man" (the misinterpretation of which was corrected after only a year and its existence was debated from the beginning), "New Guinea Man" (which is actually Homo sapiens), and the implication "Cro-Magnon" man was viewed as different from Homo sapiens.

Views on Satanism and Satanic influence 
Gladys is an example of one of Chick's tracts on astrology, witchcraft, and Satanic influence.

Chick did not oppose Christians engaging in the traditional Halloween custom of passing out candy to neighborhood children, considering it to be an opportunity to present the Gospel message via his tracts.

Based on Chick's views on Satanism and Satanic influence, Catholic Answers states that "Chick portrays a world full of paranoia and conspiracy where nothing is what it seems and nearly everything is a Satanic plot to lead people to hell."

Parodies and popular culture

In film 
 A live-action film Dark Dungeons, based on the Chick tract of the same name that warns against the supposed evil influence of Dungeons & Dragons, was released in August 2014. Producer JR Ralls was given the rights to the tract for free after contacting Chick.

In print 
Some cartoonists have published parodies that mimic Chick tracts' familiar layout and narrative conventions. Examples include:
 Devil Doll? by Daniel Clowes, Antlers of the Damned by Adam Thrasher, Jesus Delivers! by Jim Woodring and David Lasky, and Demonic Deviltry by "Dr. Robert Ramos" (actually Justin Achilli of White Wolf Game Studios).
 Issue #2 of Daniel K. Raeburn's zine The Imp, which consists of a lengthy essay on Jack T. Chick's work and a concordance of terms and concepts used in his comics, has dimensions and covers that imitate a Chick tract.
 Two parodies by Jack C. Trick, LLC and published by Trick Publications titled Chemical Salvation? (2006) and ADAM & EVIL?! (2007) tell the history of LSD and MDMA. The LSD Trick tract, which was released on Albert Hofmann's 100th birthday and was partially reprinted in a recent biography of the inventor of LSD, also appeared in a Japanese translation and a Spanish translation.
 A parody drawn by cartoonist Hal Robins, The Collector was included in chapter 13 of The Art of Jack T. Chick by Kurt Kuersteiner (2004, Schiffer Publishing, Ltd.).
 The first edition of the Season 1 Blu-ray of the animated comedy show Rick and Morty came with a print version of The Good Morty, a parody of Chick's work which also appears in Season 1 Episode 10 titled "Close Encounters of the Rick Kind". The comic is written by Justin Roiland & Ryan Ridley and illustrated by Erica Hayes.

References

Citations

Sources

Further reading

External links 

 Chick Publications official website
 God's Cartoonist - The Comic Crusade of Jack T. Chick – Documentary film on Chick and Chick comics.
 Critical view by Freemasons
 The Jack Chick Museum of Fine Art
 "The Nightmare World of Jack T. Chick", Catholic Answers (archived)

Anti-Catholic publications
Anti-Catholicism in the United States
Anti-Masonry
Christian comics
Christian countercult movement
Christian fundamentalism
Religious controversies in comics
Creationist publications
Criticism of atheism
Discrimination against LGBT people in the United States
Ephemera
Islamophobia in the United States
Islamophobic publications
Satanic ritual abuse hysteria in the United States
1960 comics debuts